"Glad All Over" is a song written by Dave Clark and Mike Smith and recorded by The Dave Clark Five.

Overview
"Glad All Over" featured Smith leading unison group vocals, often in call and response style, a saxophone line used not for solo decoration but underneath the whole song, and a big, "air hammer" beat that underpinned the wall of sound production known as the "Tottenham Sound".

Reception
Billboard said of the song that "here's a rocking, romping group vocal effort much akin to the Liverpool sound and the Beatles' school," stating that the song has a "solid beat and echo quality."  Cash Box described it as "a happy-go-lucky pounder...that sports that 'Mersey sound with the Liverpool beat.'"

In January 1964, it became the British group's first big hit, reaching No.1 on the UK Singles Chart and promptly kicked off the DC5 vs Beatles rivalry, removing the massively successful "I Want To Hold Your Hand" from the UK No.1. In April 1964, it reached No.6 on the American US Billboard Hot 100 chart, becoming the first British Invasion hit by a group other than The Beatles. It was also No.1 in Ireland, No.3 in Australia and No.2 in Canada. It reached No.4 in the Netherlands and No.16 in Germany.

"Glad All Over" was the No.2 selling single of 1964 in the UK (behind "Can't Buy Me Love" by The Beatles), and also had sufficient UK sales in November and December 1963 to make it the 58th best-selling single of 1963; put together these statistics suggest UK sales for "Glad All Over" of around 1,000,000 units by the end of 1964.

Reissue
In 1993, "Glad All Over" was reissued as a single in the UK and reached No.37 on the UK Singles Chart.

Personnel
Partial credits.
 Dave Clark – backing vocals, drums, producer
 Mike Smith – double-tracked lead/harmony vocals, Vox Continental organ
 Lenny Davidson – backing vocals, guitars
 Rick Huxley – backing vocals, bass
 Denis Payton – backing vocals, saxophone
with
 Bobby Graham – drums
 Adrian Kerridge – engineer, co-producer

Chart history

Weekly charts

Year-end charts

Use by football and rugby teams

Crystal Palace F.C. adopted the song as their anthem in the 1960s. It is played at the start of all home games, and after full-time (when Palace win). The chorus is played after home goals, after the goal scorer's name is read out. It is also sung by fans as a chant. On Saturday 10 February 1968, The Dave Clark Five played "Glad All Over" live at Crystal Palace's home, Selhurst Park. A cover version, sung by the squad at the time, was released as part of their FA Cup run (where they reached the final of the competition) in 1990.

Arsenal have used the song against Tottenham Hotspur. Blackpool have also used Glad All Over, played after a home goal is scored, and other English Football League teams including Rotherham United, Port Vale, Swindon Town and Yeovil Town have followed suit. It has also been used by Scottish Football League clubs Partick Thistle and Dunfermline Athletic F.C. when they score a goal. Woking F.C. have also played the song as part of their celebrations on scoring a goal.

, Wigan Warriors rugby league team have used it at the end of a home game at the DW Stadium if they have won.

Irish team Shamrock Rovers F.C. use it as their anthem.

Rangers F.C. used the song to sing about their striker Joe Garner with its fans trying to get it to Christmas number one in 2016. The song finished 31st on the UK Christmas charts, but topped the Scottish Singles Chart.

Macclesfield F.C. also play the song as their post-match anthem when they win.

Manchester City supporters use the song in honour of their manager, Pep Guardiola, replacing the chorus line: "I'm feelin' glad all over" with "We've got Guardiola."

Arsenal fans sing "we've got Granit Xhaka to the tune of the chorus.

Covers

American heavy metal band Quiet Riot covered the song on their debut album, released exclusively in Japan in 1978.

The Australian band Hush, in 1975; it reached No. 8 on the Australian singles chart and was the 64th biggest selling single in Australia in 1975. It was also included on their 1975 album Rough Tough 'N' Ready.
Olivia Pascal also covered this song in the year 1980.

The American punk rock band  the Descendents covered the song on their eighth studio album, 9th & Walnut, released in 2021.

References

External links
 Text of the song
 

1963 singles
The Dave Clark Five songs
UK Singles Chart number-one singles
Number-one singles in Scotland
Irish Singles Chart number-one singles
Number-one singles in New Zealand
Suzi Quatro songs
1963 songs
Columbia Graphophone Company singles
Epic Records singles
Songs written by Mike Smith (Dave Clark Five)
Songs written by Dave Clark (musician)
Football songs and chants